South Lincoln is a census-designated place (CDP) within the town of Lincoln, Addison County, Vermont, United States. It was first listed as a CDP prior to the 2020 census.

It is in eastern Addison County, in the south part of the town of Lincoln, in the valley of the New Haven River, a north-flowing tributary of Otter Creek and part of the Lake Champlain watershed. It is bordered to the south and east by the Green Mountain National Forest. South Lincoln Road leads north (downriver)  to Lincoln, and Ripton Road leads southwest  to Ripton.

Climate

According to the Köppen Climate Classification system, South Lincoln has a warm-summer humid continental climate, abbreviated "Dfb" on climate maps.

References 

Populated places in Addison County, Vermont
Census-designated places in Addison County, Vermont
Census-designated places in Vermont